Format may refer to:

Printing and visual media

 Text formatting, the typesetting of text elements
 Paper formats, or paper size standards
 Newspaper format, the size of the paper page

Computing

 File format, particular way that information is encoded for storage in a computer file
 Document file format, for storing documents on a storage media, especially for use by computer
 Audio file format, for storing digital audio data on a computer system
 Video file format, for storing digital video data on a computer system
 Content format, encoded format for converting a specific type of data to displayable information
 Disk formatting, preparing computer hard disks to store data, destroying any existing contents
 FORMAT (command), a command-line utility to format disks in many computer operating systems
 Format (Common Lisp), a programming function for formatting printed output
 Format (Fortran 66), a programming statement for formatting printed output
 Format (Algol68), a programming function and type for formatting printed output

Arts and entertainment

 Film format, standard characteristics regarding image capture on photographic film
 Format (photographic agency), agency set up in 1983 to represent women photographers
 Playoff format, type of competition in sports and games to determine an overall champion
 Radio format, the overall content broadcast on a radio station
 TV format, overall concept, premise and branding of a television program

Music

 Format (album), a compilation album of B-sides and bonus tracks released February 2012 by Pet Shop Boys
 The Format, a musical group
 The Format (album), by AZ
 DJ Format, a hip-hop artist

See also
Form (disambiguation)
Style (disambiguation)